Bewafaa sii Wafaa is a 2017 Hindi web series, created by Ekta Kapoor for her video on demand platform ALTBalaji. It stars Samir Soni, Aditi Vasudev and Dipannita Sharma as Protagonists. The web series is about two people who are madly in love but married to different people.

The series is available for streaming on the ALT Balaji App and its associated websites since its release date.

Cast
 Samir Soni as Sumair Singh Bajaj
 Aditi Vasudev as Meghna Dixit 
 Dipannita Sharma as Nishqa S. Bajaj. 
 Yudhishtir Urs as Adi/ Aditya Dixit

Reception
Bollywoodlife reviewed the show 4/5 and stated, "Bewafaa si Wafaa is a love story of two people who are married to different people but actually are not comfortable with their partners. Though it starts off on a dry note, the show gets more interesting with suspense building the crux of the story.  Samir and Aditi’s chemistry is worth a watch and their equation with each other in the series will surely teach you a thing or two about relationships."

Awards

References

External links
 Watch Bewafaa sii Wafaa on ALT Balaji website
 

2017 web series debuts
Hindi-language web series
ALTBalaji original programming
Indian drama web series